Frank Charles Spotnitz is an American television screenwriter and executive producer, best known for his work on The X-Files and The Man in the High Castle. Spotnitz is also the chief executive officer and founder of Big Light Productions, a London- and Paris-based production company, which specializes in international television series, including drama, comedy and documentaries. Spotnitz's career includes creating, writing and producing series with networks, cable, streaming and other broadcast platforms around the world.

Under the Big Light banner, Spotnitz has produced: Amazon's Emmy-winning The Man in the High Castle; Medici: Masters of Florence, and two seasons of Medici: The Magnificent (RAI, Netflix, SFR Play); The Indian Detective (Netflix, CTV); Ransom (CBS, Global, TF1, RTL); season three of Crossing Lines (Tandem Productions / StudioCanal); and season two of Transporter: The Series (TNT, M6, HBO Canada). Most recently, Spotnitz co-created and executive-produced Leonardo, which is currently in production in Italy.

Early life
Born in Camp Zama, Japan. Spotnitz's father is Jewish, though Spotnitz was not raised religiously. Spotnitz's father was a doctor in the US Army. His family moved around until they settled in Phoenix, Arizona. As a child, Spotnitz consumed television shows and films as much as he could, sometimes watching the same film two or three times in a row. Spotnitz attended Camelback High School, where he was inspired to pursue a career in Hollywood.

Spotnitz graduated from the University of California, Los Angeles (UCLA) with a bachelor's degree in English literature in 1982, where he was a reporter for the Daily Bruin. He later received a MFA in screenwriting from the AFI Conservatory in 1991.

Career

Journalism
Upon graduation from UCLA, Spotnitz was employed as a wire-service reporter for the United Press International in Indianapolis and New York. He also briefly worked for the Associated Press in Paris. Spotnitz freelanced for Entertainment Weekly and Rolling Stone before returning to his passion and studying screenwriting at AFI.

Television
Spotnitz's first television role was on The-X-Files, which he described as being "like a second film school." is writing and producing credits include: counter-terrorism drama series Strike Back (HBO/Cinemax, Sky); action series Transporter: The Series (TNT); ABC's mystery series Night Stalker (ABC), starring Stuart Townsend and Gabrielle Union; Michael Mann’s crime series Robbery Homicide Division (CBS); unconventional heroes comedy-drama The Lone Gunmen (Fox); sci-fi drama Harsh Realm (Fox); and crime thriller Millennium (Fox).

The X-Files
Spotnitz served on The X-Files for eight of its nine seasons after joining the show in 1994. He called it "a life-changing experience", graduating from staff writer to executive producer after three seasons. He directed two episodes and wrote or co-wrote more than 40 instalments of the series, including the Emmy-nominated "Memento Mori" with Chris Carter, Vince Gilligan and John Shiban in 1997. He served for four years as executive producer and three years as president of Carter's Ten Thirteen Productions. He was a producer and co-writer of both The X-Files feature films, Fight the Future (1998) and I Want to Believe (2008). Spotnitz shares three Golden Globes for Best Dramatic Series and a Peabody Award for his work on The X-Files. He was also nominated for an Emmy Award for writing and three times for Outstanding Drama Series.

Hunted
In 2012, Spotnitz created, wrote and executive-produced the international spy drama series Hunted for BBC1 and HBO/Cinemax, starring Melissa George, Adam Rayner, Stephen Dillane and Patrick Malahide. The series follows Sam Hunter, an operative for a private spy agency, Byzantium. After she is betrayed and nearly killed by one of her colleagues, Sam returns to London in an attempt to root out the traitor, while working undercover in the home of a wealthy and dangerous London gangster on an assignment that could cost her life. The series was BAFTA nominated for cinematography and won the ASC Award. It was also nominated for Best Editing by the Royal Television Society.

The Man in the High Castle
Spotnitz created, executive-produced and wrote several episodes of The Man in the High Castle, based on the classic alternative history novel by Philip K. Dick, which upon its release became Amazon's most viewed series ever. Starring Alexa Davalos, Rufus Sewell and Joel de la Fuente, the series explores life in a 1962 America where the Allies lost the war and the country is divided between the fascist Japanese in the West and the Nazis in the East. The series won two Emmy Awards, was nominated for two others, and named Best Drama Series at the Roma Fiction Festival. It was also nominated for an ASC Award for Outstanding Cinematography, the USC Scripter Award and Best Drama at Monte Carlo Television Festival's Golden Nymph Awards.

Medici
Spotnitz co-created, executive-produced and co-wrote Medici: Masters of Florence, starring Richard Madden, Dustin Hoffman and Annabel Scholey. Chronicling the rise of the Medici family during the Italian Renaissance, it shows how the family's ascent from simple merchants to power brokers sparked an economic and cultural revolution, creating powerful enemies in the process. The Netflix Original Series was produced with Lux Vide Productions for RAI, Italy's largest broadcaster, and SFR in France. The RAI premiere attracted a record-breaking seven million viewers in Italy, becoming the country's most-watched new series.

Set 20 years later, Medici: The Magnificent starred Daniel Sharman, Bradley James and Sean Bean, and was also co-created, executive-produced and co-written by Spotnitz. After an attempt on Piero de Medici's life, his son Lorenzo is forced to assume leadership of the family-run bank. Once in power, young Lorenzo resolves to abandon the cynical politics of the past to usher in a new era of creative and political revolution, bringing him into open conflict with rival banker Jacopo Pazzi, who will stop at nothing to defeat him. Their clash gives rise to one of the most thrilling true-life political intrigues of all time, the infamous Pazzi conspiracy. The second season of Medici: The Magnificent was broadcast on RAI in December 2019 and premieres as a Netflix Original Series in May 2020.

The Indian Detective
In 2017, Spotnitz co-created, executive-produced and co-wrote the comedy-drama series The Indian Detective for Canadian broadcaster CTV and Netflix. It starred international comedy sensation Russell Peters, whom Forbes magazine ranked three times in its Top 10 highest-grossing comics list. Peters portrays Doug D’Mello, a charming, smart Toronto cop, who unexpectedly finds himself investigating murder in his parents’ Indian homeland, where, despite his heritage, he remains an outsider. Canada's biggest series debut in two years was the second-most watched programme on the day of its CTV premiere, with 1.6 million viewers. It was bestowed the Golden Screen Award by the Canadian Screen Academy.

Ransom
Ransom, produced for CBS in the US, France's TF1, Canada's Corus/Global and RTL in Germany, was a suspense drama set against an international backdrop. It starred Luke Roberts and was co-created, executive-produced and co-written by Spotnitz. The thriller follows crisis and hostage negotiator Eric Beaumont, whose team is brought in to save lives when no one else can. Beaumont understands criminals better than they understand themselves and uses his insight into human behaviour to resolve the most difficult kidnap and ransom cases. Despite the stakes, Beaumont refuses to resort to violence, even when confronted by some of the world's most dangerous criminals. Ransom was VOX Germany's highest rated drama premiere for over 15 months and France's TF1 premiere reached over 4 million viewers for a market share of 25%. The show ran for three seasons.

Leonardo
Spotnitz co-created, executive-produced and co-wrote Leonardo, which was one of the first productions to complete filming during the COVID-19 pandemic in Italy. The series was released in early 2021 in RAI for Italy, Amazon Prime for the United Kingdom and Ireland, as well as Sony LIV in India, and PikTV in Canada. The eight-part limited series shows the terrible personal sacrifice that led Leonardo to create masterpieces that changed the way we see the world forever. Starring Aidan Turner and Freddie Highmore, the series is the first produced by The Alliance (RAI, France Télévisions, ZDF and RTVE).

Writing process 

Spotnitz adopted the writers' room process from his experience in the US, which he brought to the UK when he founded Big Light Productions. He cards the story scene by scene on a corkboard, with one board for each episode. Spotnitz favours carding in order to better analyse the story and to enable better collaboration. He always asks: why do I care about this story? Why do I care about this character? And aims to draw in the audience early on.

Personal life 
Spotnitz lives with his family in London.

Spotnitz said in an interview about his show The Man in the High Castle: "Frank is the closest to me in the TV series, because my father's Jewish, my mother's not. I don't identify as Jewish in a religious way. I'm not a religious person, and yet if you were living in a Nazi state, that would be no defense. Jews don't get to decide if they're Jews. That's really terrifying to me."

Filmography

The X-Files credits

Books
TV Outside the Box: Trailblazing in the Digital Television Revolution, Neil Landau (2015)
Dalla parte di John Fante, by Giovanna Di Lello and Toni Ricciardi (Rome: Carocci 2020)

References

External links 

1960 births
Living people
20th-century American male writers
21st-century American male writers
20th-century American screenwriters
21st-century American screenwriters
AFI Conservatory alumni
American male television writers
American people of Jewish descent
American television producers
American television writers
Screenwriting instructors
Showrunners
University of California, Los Angeles alumni